The Tatanagar–Alappuzha Express was an express train belonging to South Eastern Railway zone that ran between Tatanagar Junction and Alappuzha in India. It was operated with 18189/18190 train numbers on daily basis.

Cancellation
It ran as a link train which used to get attached to Dhanbad Alappuzha Express at Rourkela Junction railway station. Indian Railways is currently discontinuing the link services and this train also was discontinued. In place of this, a new Train Tatanagar - Ernakulam Express was introduced for the benefit of passengers.

See also 

 Alappuzha railway station
 Dhanbad Junction railway station
 Dhanbad–Alappuzha Express
 Tatanagar - Ernakulam Express
 Ernakulam–Patna Express (via Chennai)
 Ernakulam–Patna Express (via Tirupati)

Notes

External links 
 18189/Tatanagar– Alappuzha Express India Rail Info
 18190/Alappuzha–Tatanagar Express India Rail Info

References 

Transport in Jamshedpur
Transport in Alappuzha
Express trains in India
Rail transport in Jharkhand
Rail transport in West Bengal
Rail transport in Odisha
Rail transport in Andhra Pradesh
Rail transport in Tamil Nadu
Rail transport in Kerala